Huw "Bunf" Bunford (born Huw Cennydd Bunford; 15 September 1967 in Cardiff, Wales) is a musician best known as the guitarist in Super Furry Animals.

Biography
Bunford studied at Lanchester Polytechnic (now Coventry University) and worked as a teacher. His last teaching position was Head of Art at Ysgol Gyfun Rhydfelen near Pontypridd. From 1989 he played with Guto Pryce in the punk band U Thant, before they both joined Super Furry Animals.

Bunford's first band was the Welsh language school band Edrych am Jiwlia  which was formed in Ysgol Gyfun Gymraeg Glantaf, Cardiff.

In 2013 Bunford released music with Richard Chester under the band name Pale Blue Dots. Several songs were aired on BBC Radio Wales and C2 in Wales, and were posted on the group's SoundCloud page.

In 2012 Bunford performed a mix of found sounds with artist Naomi Kashiwagi at the Whitworth Art Gallery of University of Manchester.

Bunford also later studied film scoring and soundtrack production and has contributed to several film productions.

Discography

U Thant
1989 Dim I.D. EP Recordiau Thant
1991 Duwuwd LP Crai/Sain

Super Furry Animals

Filmography
2000 Beautiful Mistake (Camgymeriad Gwych) (with Super Furry Animals) (himself)
2004 9 Songs (with Super Furry Animals) (himself)

References

External links

1967 births
Living people
Welsh rock guitarists
Welsh-speaking musicians
Musicians from Cardiff
Super Furry Animals members
People educated at Ysgol Gyfun Gymraeg Glantaf
Alumni of Coventry University